The 2022 season was Bunyodkor's 16th season in the Uzbekistan Super League; they finished the season in eighth position and reached the Round of 16 of the Uzbekistan Cup.

Season events

Squad

Transfers

Winter

In:

Out:

Summer

In:

Out:

Friendlies

Competitions

Overview

Uzbek League

League table

Results summary

Results by round

Results

Uzbek Cup

Group stage

Knockout Stage

Squad statistics

Appearances and goals

|-
|colspan="14"|Players away on loan:
|-
|colspan="14"|Players who left Bunyodkor during the season:

|}

Goal scorers

Clean sheets

Disciplinary Record

References

Sport in Tashkent
FC Bunyodkor seasons
Bunyodkor